The 16th Southeast Asian Games were held in Manila, the Philippines from 24 November - 5 December 1991. This was the second time that the country hosted the biennial regional sporting event. It was officially opened by President Corazon Aquino at the Rizal Memorial track and football field in Manila through a colorful opening ceremony.

Opening highlights and sidelights
Brass bands, spirited and gaily-dancing college and high school students from varied schools; UST, CEU, Miriam College, etc., attired in colorful Ati-Atihan garb. The Philippine Air Force parachutists, with one unfolded the Philippine flag as he glided to the football field, march-past of participating athletes from different countries in the region, 30,000 or more spectators, including the President Corazon Aquino, were thrilled by the spectacular musical extravaganza with thousands of student-performers.

The welcome song was "One Under an Asian Sun", the song's lyrics were beamed in a huge electronic board. The trio of Lydia de Vega-Mercado, Carlos 'Caloy' Loyzaga and golfer Gerard Cantada puts emphasis on the past, present and the future. Lydia lit the flame in the cauldron. The march-past of foreign athletes, sports officials and delegates from the participating countries in the region earned a lot of cheers and applause from the crowd.

Medalists

Gold

Silver

Bronze

Multiple

Demonstration sport
Medals earned in a Demonstration Sport is not counted on the medal haul.

Medal summary

By sports

Gold medalists
In Swimming, Eric Buhain garnered a record six golds to emerge the biennial meet's most bemedalled athlete. Akiko Thomson, losing one gold on a finishing touch technicality, settled for two record-smashing golds.
Boxing surpassed its target, drawing eight golds from pinweight Mansueto Velasco Jr, light flyweight Elias Recaido Jr, bantamweight Roberto Jalnaiz, featherweight Julito Lopez, lightweight Ronald Chavez, light welterweight Arlo Chavez, welterweight Victor Vicera and light heavyweight Raymundo Suico.
Bea Lucero enshrined herself in the record book when she ruled the bantamweight division in taekwondo, becoming the meet's first athlete to triumph in two different sports.
Lydia de Vega-Mercado regain her fastest woman tag, she topped the 100-meter dash with a time of 11.44 seconds at the expense of new track sensation Goldivasamy Shanti of Malaysia and Elma Muros. She failed to repeat over Shanti in the 200m and consoled herself with a silver finish.
The record-setting triumph of Elma Muros in the 100m hurdles and her epic victory in the long jump, the first woman to rule the event four times in a row, paved the way for seven golds in athletics - the most for Filipinos in the event since 1987.
Tennis player Felix Barrientos, the top Filipino netter in his first SEAG stint, won the individual gold and figuring in the doubles and mixed doubles finals with Roland So and Jennifer Saberon.
Golfer Mary Grace Estuesta reaffirmed her billing as the region's best amateur golfer when she kept her individual title and powered the Philippines to the team crown.
The Philippine men's national basketball team regain the cage supremacy, defeating Thailand, 77–72, in front of a crowd of 20,000 at the close of basketball competitions at the Araneta Coliseum.

References

External links
http://www.olympic.ph

Southeast Asian Games
Nations at the 1991 Southeast Asian Games
1991